The sixth season of CSI: Miami premiered on CBS on September 24, 2007 and ended May 19, 2008. The series stars David Caruso and Emily Procter.

Description 
As Alexx bids farewell to the team, Horatio and her successor find themselves victims of fatal gun-play; but all is not as it appears during the sixth season of CSI: Miami. As Eric fights to regain control of his life, help comes from an unlikely source in the form of deceased Detective Tim Speedle. Horatio faces off with a vengeful private investigator, whilst his undercover past, and his son, come back to haunt him. A body in a sinkhole, internet predators, Horatio's extradition to Brazil, and Calleigh's untimely kidnapping only compound the struggles of Caine, Duquesne, and their elite team of Crime Scene Investigators.

Production 
Despite being credited for the entire season, Khandi Alexander only appeared in the first 19 episodes and departed the cast as a series regular. Only 13 episodes had been completed before the 2007–08 Writers Guild of America strike. After the strike, eight more episodes were made, resulting in a 21-episode season.

Cast

Starring 
 David Caruso as Horatio Caine; a CSI Lieutenant and the Director of the MDPD Crime Lab.
 Emily Procter as Calleigh Duquesne; a veteran CSI Detective, the CSI Assistant Supervisor and a ballistics expert.
 Adam Rodriguez as Eric Delko; a CSI Detective and Wolfe's partner.
 Khandi Alexander as Alexx Woods; a Medical Examiner assigned to CSI. (Episodes 1-19)
 Jonathan Togo as Ryan Wolfe; a CSI Detective and Delko's partner.
 Rex Linn as Frank Tripp; a senior Robbery-Homicide Division (RHD) Detective assigned to assist the CSI's.
 Eva LaRue as Natalia Boa Vista; a CSI Detective.

Recurring 
Sofia Milos as Yelina Salas; a Private Investigator.
Rory Cochrane as Tim Speedle; a deceased MDPD CSI Detective.
Johnny Whitworth as Jake Berkeley; an undercover MDPD Detective.
Alison McAtee as Shannon Higgins; the team's newest Medical Examiner.
Evan Ellingson as Kyle Harmon; Horatio's son.
Elizabeth Berkley as Julia Winston; Kyle's mother.
David Lee Smith as Rick Stetler; an IAB officer.

Episodes

References

06
2007 American television seasons
2008 American television seasons